The 2011–12 season was the 44th season of the Northern Premier League Premier Division, and the fifth season of the Northern Premier League Division One North and South.

The League sponsors for 2011–12 were Evo-Stik. The league allocations were released on 20 May 2011.

Premier Division

The Premier Division featured five new teams:

Chester, promoted as champions from NPL Division One North
Chorley, promoted via play-offs from NPL Division One North
Hednesford Town, transferred from Southern League Premier Division
Rushall Olympic, promoted via play-offs from NPL Division One South
Stafford Rangers, relegated from Conference North

League table

Play-offs

*AET

Semi-finals

Final

Results grid

Stadia and locations

Division One North

Division One North featured two new teams:
Farsley, promoted as champions from the Northern Counties East League Premier Division
Ossett Town, relegated from the NPL Premier Division

League table

Play-offs

Semi-finals

Curzon Ashton win 4–2 on penalties

Final

Results grid

Stadia and locations

Division One South

Division One South featured four new teams:
Coalville Town, promoted as champions from the Midland Alliance
Hucknall Town, relegated from the NPL Premier Division
Ilkeston, new team
New Mills, promoted as champions from the North West Counties League Premier Division

League table

Play-offs

Semi-finals

Leek Town win 6–7 on penalties

Final

Results grid

Stadia and locations

Challenge Cup

The 2011–12 Northern Premier League Challenge Cup (billed as the 2011–12 Doodson Sports Cup for sponsorship reasons) is the 42nd season of the Northern Premier League Challenge Cup, the cup competition of the Northern Premier League. The tournament was won by North Ferriby United who beat Rushall Olympic 4–1 after extra-time.

Calendar

Preliminary round
In the preliminary round, eight teams from the lower regional divisions were drawn together.

First round
The four clubs which made it through the preliminary round enter into the draw with the rest of the teams from the two Division One leagues which weren't drawn into the preliminary round.

*Mossley were removed from the competition as they had not registered a player correctly.

Second round
The twenty clubs which made it through the first round were entered into the draw for the second round.

Third round
The ten clubs which made it through the second round were entered into the draw for the second round with the clubs from the Premier Division.

Fourth round
The 16 clubs which made it through the third round were entered into the draw for the fourth round.

Quarter-finals
The eight clubs to have made it through the fourth round were entered into the Quarter-finals draw.

Semi-finals
The four clubs to have made it through the Quarter-finals were entered into the Semi-finals draw.

Final
The two clubs to have made it through the Semi-finals play each other in the final to decide the winner of the Challenge Cup.

President's Cup

At the 2011 league AGM, the 2011–12 Northern Premier League President's Cup, the cup competition of the Northern Premier League Division One North and South, was deferred for at least one year due to fixture congestion and clubs making losses from the games. It was decided to award the trophy to the team that tops the fair play league at the end of the season instead.

Peter Swales Shield

The Peter Swales Shield has changed format several times, and the 2012–13 season saw the champions of the Premier Division, Chester, play against the winners of the Challenge Cup, North Ferriby United. Chester won the game 3–0.

See also
2011–12 Isthmian League
2011–12 Southern League

References

External links
Official website
Official Northern Premier League Match Photo Gallery

Northern Premier League seasons
7